is a museum dedicated to instant noodles and Cup Noodles, as well as its creator and founder, Momofuku Ando.

The museum is located in Ikeda in Osaka, and is located within walking distance of Ikeda Station on the Hankyu-Takarazuka Line. Admission is free.

There is also a CupNoodles Museum located in Yokohama, which features four stories of exhibitions and attractions. This location includes various exhibits to display the history of instant ramen and Momofuku Ando's story.

Features
Admission is free.

Both museums have an instant ramen workshop allowing visitors to make their own "fresh" instant noodles (fresh as in just made). Reservations must be made in advance to enjoy this feature at the museum. There is also a noodle factory where visitors can assemble their own personal Cup Noodles from pre-made ingredients for a small fee of 300 yen.

See also
List of museums in Japan

References

External links

The Momofuku Ando Instant Ramen Museum 
The Momofuku Ando Instant Ramen Museum 
The Momofuku Ando Instant Ramen Museum 
CupNoodles Exhibitions/Attractions 
CupNoodles Museum 
CupNoodles Museum 

Museums in Osaka Prefecture
Food museums in Japan
Ramen
Ramen shops
Ikeda, Osaka
Museums established in 1999
1999 establishments in Japan